Line 2 of the Zhengzhou Metro is a rapid transit line running from north to south of Zhengzhou. It opened on 19 August 2016. The line is currently 30.9 km long with 22 stations.

Through services are operated on Line 2 and Chengjiao line (part of future Line 9), although they are classified as separate lines.

History

The first phase of the line began construction on 28 December 2010, and began operations on 19 August 2016. The second phase of the line began operations on 28 December 2019.

Opening timeline

Stations

References

 
Railway lines opened in 2016
2016 establishments in China
Zhengzhou Metro lines